The Mounties Rugby League Football Club (sponsored by Mounties Group) is an Australian rugby league football club based in Mount Pritchard, New South Wales formed in 1927. They currently play in the Ron Massey Cup and Sydney Shield.

Recent Seasons

2015 
In 2015, Mounties defeated the Asquith Magpies to win the Ron Massey Cup 30–14.

2016 
Mounties achieved a rare feet in 2016 by having all 3 grades NSW Cup, Ron Massey Cup and the Sydney Shield finish first in the regular season and win the minor premiership.  Not since 1985 had a club finished top of all 3 grades to claim the minor premiership in the same year.  The last team to do so before this was the St. George Dragons.  Mounties also finished the season with all 3 grades making the grand final.  The Sydney shield side was defeated by East Campbelltown Eagles, the Ron Massey Cup side won against St Mary's Saints and Illawarra Cutters defeated Mounties in the NSW Cup grand final.

2017 
Mounties finished 5th in the Intrust Super Premiership NSW season.  On 3 September 2017, Mounties faced off against Illawarra in the elimination final which was a rematch from last years Grand Final.  Mounties went on to be defeated by Illawarra 30–26 and were eliminated.  On 24 September 2017, the Sydney Shield side made it to the grand final against St Mary's but lost the match 34–20.  On 24 October 2017, coach Steve Antonelli announced he was leaving the club after five years in charge to join Canterbury as assistant coach to Dean Pay.  On 5 December 2017, Mounties announced that Ryan Carr would be new head coach of the Intrust Super Premiership NSW side for The 2018 season.

2018 
Mounties qualified for the 2018 Intrust Super Premiership NSW finals series finishing 6th on the table.  Mounties progressed the second week on the final series where they were defeated 34–16 by Newtown ending their season.
The Mounties Ron Massey Cup team also made it to the second week of the finals series but were defeated 20–14 by the Concord-Glebe Wolves.

2019 
Mounties finished the 2019 Canterbury Cup NSW season in sixth place on the table and qualified for the finals.  Mounties were eliminated in week one of the finals series as they were defeated by Newtown 44–20 at Campbelltown Stadium.

The Ron Massey Cup side also qualified for the finals and reached the preliminary final but were defeated 22-12 by Wentworthville at Kogarah Oval.

2020 
Mounties entered in the Canterbury Cup and Ron Massey Cup competitions, however both were cancelled after one round due to the COVID-19 pandemic in Australia.

In August 2020, it was announced that Mounties had joined forces with NRL side Canterbury-Bankstown to act as their feeder club side in the Canterbury Cup NSW competition for the next two years starting in 2021.

2022
Mounties finished 9th on the table during the 2022 NSW Cup season. The Ron Massey Cup side had a slightly better season finishing 5th on the table.

NRL Juniors
Arthur Summons (1960–64 Western Suburbs)
Bob O'Reilly (1967–82 Parramatta Eels, Penrith Panthers & Eastern Suburbs)
Geoff Gerard (1974–89 Parramatta Eels, Manly-Warringah & Penrith Panthers)
Eric Grothe, Sr. (1979–89 Parramatta Eels)
Steve Ella (1979–88 Parramatta Eels)
Brad Fittler (1989-04 Penrith Panthers & Sydney Roosters)
Lenny Beckett (1999-02 Newcastle Knights & Northern Eagles)
Eric Grothe Jr (1999-10 Parramatta Eels & Sydney Roosters)
Shane Shackleton (2005–12 Sydney Roosters, Parramatta Eels & Penrith Panthers)
Tony Williams (2008 Parramatta Eels, Manly-Warringah, Canterbury-Bankstown Bulldogs & Cronulla Sutherland Sharks)
Shannon Boyd (2014–20 Canberra Raiders, Gold Coast Titans)
Nathan Davis (2016–17 Parramatta Eels, Gold Coast Titans)
Tevita Funa (2020- Manly-Warringah)
Josh Schuster (2020- Manly-Warringah)

Honours
Intrust Super Premiership NSW Minor Premiers:
 2015, 2016
Ron Massey Cup Premiership: 
 2015, 2016
Ron Massey Cup Minor Premiers:
2014
Sydney Shield Minor Premiers:
 2016, 2017

Playing Record in NSWRL Competitions

NSW Cup

Ron Massey Cup 
The club has had two stints in third tier NSWRL competitions - initially in the early 1990s and from 2007 to the present.

Sydney Shield

See also

National Rugby League reserves affiliations
List of rugby league clubs in Australia
Rugby league in New South Wales

References

External links
Mounties Group Website
Mounties Rugby League Facebook
Mounties Rugby League Twitter
Mounties Rugby League Instagram

Rugby league teams in Sydney
Rugby clubs established in 1927
1927 establishments in Australia
Ron Massey Cup